Bellwoods was a provincial riding in Ontario, Canada in the old City of Toronto's west-end. It was represented in the Legislative Assembly of Ontario from 1926 until 1987,  when it was abolished and redistributed into the Dovercourt, and Fort York districts.

Boundaries
The district was named after Trinity Bellwoods Park, where the original Trinity College campus was located. It was created in 1926 from the Toronto Southwest and Toronto Northwest ridings. The boundaries varied over its 61 years, with its most northern boundary being the city limits just north of St. Clair Avenue. The eastern boundary went as far as Bathurst Street, and its western boundary  eventually ended at Dovercourt Road. Bellwoods was demographically a mainly working class district, with a significant immigrant population. As of 2011, the area that Bellwoods represented is divided among the current Davenport, St. Paul's and  Trinity—Spadina electoral districts.

Members of Provincial Parliament

Election results

1926 boundaries

1934 boundaries

1966 boundaries

1974 boundaries

References

Notes

Citations

Former provincial electoral districts of Ontario
Provincial electoral districts of Toronto